Traherne, Trahern, or Treherne is a Welsh surname, and may refer to:

 Cennydd Traherne (1910–1995), Welsh landowner
 John Treherne (1929–1989), English entomologist
 John Montgomery Traherne (1788–1860), Welsh Anglican priest and antiquarian
 Llewelyn Traherne (1766–1842), Welsh magistrate, High Sheriff of Glamorgan in 1801
 Margaret Traherne (1919–2006), British artist
 Philip Traherne (1635–1686), English diplomat and author
 Thomas Traherne (c. 1636 – 1674), English poet and religious writer 
 Thomas Trahern (officer of arms) (died 1542), English officer-of-arms, Somerset Herald

See also
 Traherne Island, one of two islands contained within the Motu Manawa (Pollen Island) Marine Reserve
 Treherne (disambiguation)

Anglicised Welsh-language surnames